The Communauté de communes Monts et Vallées Ouest Creuse was a short-lived communauté de communes, an intercommunal structure, in the Creuse department, in the Nouvelle-Aquitaine region, central France. It was created in January 2017 by the merger of the communautés de communes Pays Dunois, Pays Sostranien and Bénévent-Grand-Bourg. This merger was revoked by the administrative court, and on 31 December 2019 the former communautés de communes were recreated. Its population was 25,119 in 2016. Its seat was in La Souterraine.

Communes
The communauté de communes consisted of the following 43 communes:

Arrènes
Augères
Aulon
Azat-Châtenet
Azerables
Bazelat
Bénévent-l'Abbaye
Le Bourg-d'Hem
La Celle-Dunoise
Ceyroux
Chambon-Sainte-Croix
Chamborand
La Chapelle-Baloue
Châtelus-le-Marcheix
Chéniers
Colondannes
Crozant
Dun-le-Palestel
Fleurat
Fresselines
Fursac
Le Grand-Bourg
Lafat
Lizières
Maison-Feyne
Marsac
Mourioux-Vieilleville
Naillat
Noth
Nouzerolles
Sagnat
Saint-Agnant-de-Versillat
Saint-Germain-Beaupré
Saint-Goussaud
Saint-Léger-Bridereix
Saint-Maurice-la-Souterraine
Saint-Priest-la-Feuille
Saint-Priest-la-Plaine
Saint-Sébastien
Saint-Sulpice-le-Dunois
La Souterraine
Vareilles
Villard

References

Monts et Vallées Ouest Creuse